Zhirkovsky is a rural locality (a khutor) in Blizhneositinovskoye Rural Settlement, Surovikinsky District, Volgograd Oblast, Russia. The population was 308 as of 2010. There are 6 streets.

Geography 
Zhirkovsky is located on the Dobraya River, 9 km northeast of Surovikino (the district's administrative centre) by road. Surovikino is the nearest rural locality.

References 

Rural localities in Surovikinsky District